John MacGonigle was an American politician. He served as the fourteenth mayor of Lancaster, Pennsylvania from 1877 to 1884.

References

Mayors of Lancaster, Pennsylvania